The following is a list of the 17 cantons of the Haut-Rhin department, in France, following the French canton reorganisation which came into effect in March 2015:

Altkirch
Brunstatt-Didenheim
Cernay
Colmar-1
Colmar-2
Ensisheim
Guebwiller
Kingersheim
Masevaux-Niederbruck
Mulhouse-1
Mulhouse-2
Mulhouse-3
Rixheim
Saint-Louis
Sainte-Marie-aux-Mines
Wintzenheim
Wittenheim

References